Skirl may refer to:

Skirl (1999), a CD by Jim Pugliese and David Watson 
Skirl Records, an American record label